"Meet Me Half Way" is a song by American singer Kenny Loggins written by Giorgio Moroder and Tom Whitlock for the film Over the Top. It also appears as the final track on his sixth studio album Back to Avalon. It was his sixth soundtrack single and also his 13th Top 40 single, peaking at number 11, while it was more successful on the Adult Contemporary chart, peaking at number two.

Release
The single debuted at number 95 on the Billboard Hot 100 and spent twenty-five weeks on the chart, peaking at number 11 in the week of June 13, 1987. It was ranked 96th on the Billboard Year-End Hot 100 singles of 1987. It also peaked at number 28 on the Canadian RPM 100 chart.

Music video
The music video shows Loggins walking to a bar where he starts singing, then walks on a highway carrying his guitar. He then stops to sit at a nearby stand and walks into the desert. Clips from the movie play throughout the music video.

Track listing
 "Meet Me Half Way" – 3:31
 "Semifinal" (Giorgio Moroder) – 3:45

Personnel
Kenny Loggins – vocals
Giorgio Moroder – synthesizers, producer
Richie Zito – guitar
Dann Huff – guitar
Brian Banks – synthesizers
Anthony Marinelli – synthesizers
Terry Wilson – synthesizers
Brian Reeves – engineer and mixing
Brian Gardner – mastering

Charts

References

Songs written for films
1987 songs
1987 singles
Columbia Records singles
Kenny Loggins songs
Songs about friendship
Song recordings produced by Giorgio Moroder
Songs written by Giorgio Moroder
Songs written by Tom Whitlock